Puzzle Play is an Australian pre-school themed TV show for young children that aired Monday to Friday in every province in Australia and some countries in the Pacific Islands and South-East Asia from 8:30 am to 9:00 am on Network Ten. The program premiered on 21 December 2006 replacing the program In the Box. The hosts were Kellyn Morris, Patrick MacDonald and Liam Nunan. Scriptwriter and Producer is Bettina Toth.

The show conducted a casting call for a male teenage host. MacDonald (21) from Gold Coast, Morris (16) from Gold Coast, Nunan (19) from Bondi Beach has also graduated from NIDA are the hosts. The host's working together to solve each day a puzzle.

Each clue was usually a video with a host narrating about the shape with information about it. The hosts visited schools, preschools, kindergartens and parks. As the pieces were being removed, a picture was revealed in the background and in the end, the three hosts guessed what the picture was about.

Before the show was aired, it replaced the show "In the Box". Puzzle Play was replaced on 31 January 2011 by not very good "Wurrawhy".

See also 
 List of Australian television series

External links
 

Australian children's television series
Network 10 original programming
2006 Australian television series debuts
2011 Australian television series endings
English-language television shows
Television shows set in Brisbane
Australian television series with live action and animation
Australian preschool education television series